The 7th Military Division was a regional army division of the Armistice Army, the Vichy France military permitted under the Armistice of 22 June 1940 after the defeat of France.

History 
Under the terms of the Armistice of 22 June 1940, the old French Third Republic was disestablished, and with it, its lands were divided.  In Northern France and Western France, the Wehrmacht took direct control of the country while the central and Southern regions were controlled by a new nation, Vichy France.  The new nation was limited in the size of its armed forces, so a reorganisation of the region was ordered.  The 1st Group of Military Divisions was formed in Avignon and covered the eastern parts of the country, while the 2nd Group covered the west.  The 7th Division encompassed the unoccupied portions of the departments of Jura, Saône-et-Loire, as well as all of Ain.

On 12 September 1940, the 7th Military Division was stood up under command of Major General  (former Deputy Commander, 14th Military Division). Later that year he was replaced by Major General , and in the same year replaced by Major General Marie Alphonse Théodore René Adrian Desmazes, and replaced again by Major General . In 1941, Keller was replaced by either Major General  or Major General . In 1941, Major General Pierre Jules André Marie de La Font Chabert took command of the division, and following Case Anton himself and the division was demobilised on 27 November 1942.

Organisation 
By 15 April 1941, the 7th Military Division was under the command of one of the two corps sized regional commands, the 1st Group of Military Division based in Avignon.  The below structure is that of the division on the division mentioned beforehand.
 Headquarters, 7th Military Division, in Bourg-en-Bresse
 8th Group, 7th Signal Regiment, in Bourg-en-Bresse
 5th Dragoon Regiment (8 x AMD Panhard 178), in Mâcon – (mounted, no motor transport)
 , in Bourg-en-Bresse – HQ and 1st Battalion
 2nd Battalion, in Sathonay-Camp
 3rd Battalion, in Mâcon
 , in Lons-le-Saunier (HQ + 3 x battalions)
 4th Chasseurs à Pied Demi-Brigade, in Belley – HQ and 1st Chasseur Battalion
 , in Jujurieux
 , in Neuville-sur-Ain and at the Camp de Thol
 , in Valbonne (Field Artillery, 36 x Canon de 75 modèle 1897) – (HQ + 3 x battalions)
 10th Engineer Battalion, in Valbonne
 7th Transportation Group, in Bourg-en-Bresse
 4th Regiment, 1st Guard Legion, in Saint-Maurice-de-Beynost
 Valbonne Training Grounds
 Saône-et-Loire Departmental Command
 Charolles District Command
 Louhans District Command
 Ain Departmental Command
 Nantua District Command
 Jura Departmental Command
 Lons-le-Saunier District Command
 Saint-Claude District Command

Footnotes 
Notes

Citations

References 

 
 

Military units and formations established in 1940
Military units and formations disestablished in 1941
Military units and formations of France in World War II
Divisions of Vichy France
1940 establishments in France
1942 disestablishments in France